CA Intermediate is the second level exam, of a course in India, Chartered Accountancy. It has eight subjects and over 7000 pages of study material that a student is expected to cover in the nine months study period allotted to them.

The group system is what makes this exam even more difficult, as a group consists of four subjects, and a candidate has to pass all four papers in order to clear the group. Failure to pass in one subject immediately results in the failure of the entire group, which would mean that the student fails in the subjects in which he has passed.

It is to be noted that the average passing percentage up to the year 2020 has been 16.76% only, which means only 4 out of every 25 students appearing for the exam manage to pass it. That being said, the least passing percentage was just 8.88% in the attempt of November 2018
Chartered Accountancy Course in India.

Eligibility 
Students after clearing the Common Proficiency Test (CPT) or CA Foundation Course become eligible to register for the CA Intermediate. Alternatively, graduates, postgraduates or students having equivalent degrees can directly register for the CA Intermediate exam without appearing for the entry level exams.

Test model 
It is a complete subjective paper pattern for 4 papers and combined subjective & objective (70:30) for rest 4 subject. Eight subjects and two groups consisting 800 marks. Subjects are given as follows:

MODULE 1
 Accounting
 Corporate and other Laws
 Cost and Management Accounting
 Taxation
MODULE 2
Advance Accounting
 Auditing and Assurance
 Enterprise Information System and Strategic Management
 Financial Management & Economics for Finance
Students are required to obtain 40% marks in each paper and 50% marks in aggregate of all the subjects. A student can appear in either one group or both the groups at a time.

Exam date 
Exam for the CA Intermediate are held twice in a year, generally in the first week of May and November.

Result date 
Result for the CA Intermediate declares in the month of August and February i.e. two and half months after the exam.

Exemption 
The subject in which a student scores 60% or more marks will get exempted for the next three attempts. However, in order to claim the exemption, candidates must have appeared in all the papers of that Group/Unit.

Commencement of articleship 
A student after clearing either one group or both the groups can commence articleship training for three years under a practising Chartered Accountant. But after two and half years completed of articleship students are eligible for final exam.

See also 
 Education in India
 Institute of Chartered Accountants of India
 Chartered accountant
 Indian Chartered Accountancy Course

References

External links 
 https://www.icai.org/

Accounting in India
Accounting education